Chu Tien-hsin (born 12 March 1958) is a Taiwanese writer. She is considered Taiwan's foremost author on life in military dependents' villages.

Her father Chu Hsi-ning and older sister Chu Tien-wen are also famous writers.

Biography
Chu began writing in high school and her early short stories and essays were published in 1977 as Fangzhou shang de rizi (Days on the ark) and Jirang ge (Songs of rustic pleasures). She graduated from Taipei First Girls' High School and then studied history at National Taiwan University. In 1984, she married writer and editor Xie Caijun. Their daughter was born in 1986. She wrote a number of articles for the weekly China Times.

Chu was influenced in her development as a writer by her father and also by writer and editor Hu Lancheng. In her work, she explores the challenges of reestablishing and maintaining cultural identity in a modern world.

Chu is a member of the advocacy group The Alliance for Ethnic Equality which opposes the exploitation of ethnic differences for political gain. In 2012, she was part of a group lobbying for the creation of an independent agency responsible for animal protection.

Works translated to English

"The Last Train to Tamshui" was adapted into a 1986 film directed by Ko I-chen, starring Yu An-shun and Fang Wen-lin.

References 

1958 births
Living people
Taiwanese journalists
Taiwanese women journalists
Taiwanese activists
Taiwanese women activists
National Taiwan University alumni
Writers from Kaohsiung
Taiwanese women short story writers